Frederick J. "Fred" Mautino (born November 7, 1936) was an American football player.  

A native of Reading, Pennsylvania, Mautino attended Reading Senior High School and Staunton Military Academy. He then played college football at the end position for Syracuse. He helped lead the 1959 Syracuse Orangemen football team to the school's only national championship. 

Prior to the 1960 Cotton Bowl, Mautino proclaimed the 1959 Orangemen "the greatest college team of all time." He was selected by the Associated Press as a first-team player on its 1959 College Football All-America Team. He was also selected at the 1959 athlete of the year for Berks County, Pennsylvania. 

As a senior in 1960, he was selected as a third-team All-American by the American Football Coaches Association and the United Press International.

References

1936 births
Living people
American football ends
Players of American football from Pennsylvania
Sportspeople from Reading, Pennsylvania
Staunton Military Academy alumni
Syracuse Orange football players